Yessenia Andrea López López (born 20 October 1990), best known as Paloma López, is a Chilean footballer who plays as a midfielder for Colo-Colo and the Chile women's national team.

International career
López scored two goals at the 2018 Copa América Femenina, where Chile qualified to a FIFA Women's World Cup for the first time in its history.

International goals
Scores and results list Chile's goal tally first

References

External links
Paloma López at Txapeldunak.com 

1990 births
Living people
Sportspeople from Viña del Mar
Chilean women's footballers
Women's association football midfielders
Everton de Viña del Mar footballers
Santos FC (women) players
Santiago Morning (women) footballers
Universidad de Chile footballers
Primera División (women) players
Sporting de Huelva players
Chile women's international footballers
Chilean expatriate women's footballers
Chilean expatriate sportspeople in Brazil
Expatriate women's footballers in Brazil
Chilean expatriate sportspeople in Spain
Expatriate women's footballers in Spain
2019 FIFA Women's World Cup players
Footballers at the 2020 Summer Olympics
Olympic footballers of Chile